Willy Rutto Komen (born 22 December 1987) is a Kenyan runner who specializes in the 3000 metres steeplechase.

International competitions

Personal bests
1500 metres – 3:40.0 min (2007)
3000 metres steeplechase – 8:11.18 min (2007)

External links
 

1987 births
Living people
Kenyan male middle-distance runners
Kenyan male steeplechase runners
African Games gold medalists for Kenya
African Games medalists in athletics (track and field)
Athletes (track and field) at the 2007 All-Africa Games